"Jeg vil ha' dig for mig selv" (translated as "I want you for myself" in Danish) is a 2009 Danish language song by Danish artist Burhan G that was a hit on Tracklisten - the Danish official Top 40 singles chart, reaching number 8. It stayed a total of 30 weeks in the Norwegian chart.

The song taken from Burhan G's self-titled album Burhan G largely samples in its music the Milli Vanilli song "Girl You Know It's True" largely samples on the original song. (Burhan G Video)

Burhan G released a remix with additional rap verses featuring the duo Nik & Jay. The remix appeared in his album Burhan G Special Edition published in 2011

Chart performance

References

External links
 Girl you know it's true - Milli Vanilli
Jeg vil ha' dig for mig selv - Burhan G

2009 singles
Burhan G songs
Danish-language songs
2008 songs
Song articles with missing songwriters